This is a list of schools in Putrajaya, Malaysia. It is categorised according to the variants of schools in Malaysia, and is arranged alphabetically.

 International Modern Arabic School
 Nexus International School Malaysia
 Sekolah Alam Shah
 Putrajaya Presint 8 (1) secondary school [formally known as Sekolah menengah Kebangsaan Putrajaya 1]
 Sekolah Kebangsaan Putrajaya Presint 8 (1) [formally known as Sekolah Kebangsaan Putrajaya 1]
 Sekolah Kebangsaan Putrajaya Presint 8 (2)
 Sekolah Kebangsaan Putrajaya Presint 9 (1) [formally known as Sekolah Kebangsaan Putrajaya 2]
 Sekolah Kebangsaan Putrajaya Presint 9 (2)
 Sekolah Kebangsaan Putrajaya Presint 11 (1) [formally known as Sekolah Kebangsaan Putrajaya 4]
 Sekolah Kebangsaan Putrajaya Presint 11 (2)
 Sekolah Kebangsaan Putrajaya Presint 11 (3)
 Sekolah Kebangsaan Putrajaya Presint 14 (1)
 Sekolah Kebangsaan Putrajaya Presint 16 (1) [formally known as Sekolah Kebangsaan Putrajaya 3]
 Sekolah Kebangsaan Putrajaya Presint 16 (2)
 Sekolah Kebangsaan Putrajaya Presint 18 (1)
 Sekolah Kebangsaan Putrajaya Presint 18 (2)

Secondary education Sekolah Menengah Kebangsaan (SMK) 

 Sekolah Menengah Kebangsaan Agama Putrajaya

Putrajaya